General elections were held in the Netherlands on 9 June 1891. The Liberal Union emerged as the largest party, winning 53 of the 100 seats in the House of Representatives.

Results

By district
  Social Democratic  
  Liberal  
  Conservative  
  Anti-Revolutionary  
  Catholic

References

General elections in the Netherlands
Netherlands
1891 in the Netherlands
Election and referendum articles with incomplete results